Franklin Farm refers to both a census-designated place (CDP) and a planned community located within the Oak Hill section of Fairfax County, Virginia, United States. It is a suburb of Washington, D.C., located about 20 miles west of the White House.

The Franklin Farm CDP, which was named for the older planned community contained within, had a population of 19,288 as of the 2010 census. The population was divided among 6,197 housing units, which were spread across 4.78 square miles (3,059 acres) of land.

The planned community of Franklin Farm is located within the CDP. Covering slightly less than 30 percent of the CDP, the planned community occupies 1.32 square miles (850 acres) and contains 1,777 housing units. It was established in 1980 and features 13 miles of trails, 6 fishing ponds, 6 tennis courts, 2 swimming pools, 14 tot lots, 3 multipurpose courts, 1 sand volleyball court, and 180 acres of open space. The Fairfax County Parkway bisects the community. The Franklin Farm Foundation is the homeowner association with jurisdiction over the planned community.

As an unincorporated area, Franklin Farm's CDP boundaries are not officially defined by either a municipal government or by the government of Fairfax County, though the Franklin Farm Foundation does have specific boundaries.

History
The namesake farm was purchased by airline pilot James Franklin in 1936, from a $10,000 sweepstakes winning. The farm expanded from 100 to 827 acres by 1979, before it was sold for development.  The Franklin Farm community eventually included 1,777 homes in 27 neighborhoods.

References

External links
Franklin Farm Foundation – homeowner association

Census-designated places in Fairfax County, Virginia
Washington metropolitan area
Census-designated places in Virginia
Populated places established in 1980
1980 establishments in Virginia